Crimp is a hamlet in the parish of Morwenstow, Cornwall, England.

References

Hamlets in Cornwall
Morwenstow